Tiffany Kiara Hayes (born September 20, 1989) is an American-Azerbaijani professional basketball player for the Connecticut Sun of the Women's National Basketball Association (WNBA). Hayes played college basketball for the Connecticut Huskies, playing for the 2009 and 2010 NCAA National Champions.

Early life
Hayes was born September 20, 1989 in Winter Haven, a city in Central Florida to Dorothy and Renard Hayes.

High school
Hayes played basketball for Winter Haven High School in Winter Haven, Florida. The team compiled a 117–9 record during her career, and won the state championship in 2004 and 2007. She was the leading scorer on her team, scoring an average of 18.3 points per game.

Hayes helped lead the AAU team Essence to the 2007 National Championship.

Hayes was invited to the 2007 Youth Development Festival, a USA Basketball sponsored event for elite sophomores and juniors in high school, biennially at the U.S. Olympic Training Center. The 2007 event featured three teams from the US and a team representing Brazil. Hayes was leading scorer of the White USA team, which won five of its games to clinch the gold medal. Hoopgulrz.com named Hayes the outstanding player of the Festival.

Hayes participated in the 2008 Nike SPARQ Training 'My Better' Championship event. She finished the preliminary round as one of the top twenty-two out of the 3,000 high school athletes competing. The top finishers were flown to Nike World Headquarters for the finals. Hayes finished second among all females competing.

College career
Hayes played for the University of Connecticut Huskies. She knew about the program when she was a little girl, and had interest in UConn since childhood. UConn became interested in Hayes in 2006, when an assistant coach, Tonya Cardoza, saw her playing AAU ball. Despite heavy recruitment by many other schools, UConn made an offer when Hayes was a junior, and Hayes committed to attend Connecticut.

She asked to wear number 3, the number most recently worn by UConn legend Diana Taurasi. Hayes was not a starter at the beginning of the season, but after teammate Caroline Doty was injured, she stepped into the starting line-up. Her career high scoring game was against California in the regional semifinal of the NCAA Championship. Connecticut won every game of the season by double digits, but found itself in the unusual position of being eight points behind in the California game. Hayes scored 28 points to help lead the team to a victory.

Hayes was invited to the tryouts for the USA Women’s World University Games Team. She made the team, as the youngest player on the team, and the only freshman. She helped the team to a 7–0 record and a gold medal in Belgrade, Serbia.

On the fifth of February 2011, the Connecticut Huskies beat DePaul 89–66. This game was the 100th win in Hayes' college career, and occurred in her 101st game, making her the fastest player in NCAA basketball history to reach 100 wins. Hayes scored 35 points against Syracuse on January 26, setting a career high, and followed that up with 33 points against South Florida, two days later. The 68 combined points in back-to-back games is the highest point total in consecutive game by any Connecticut player in history.

College statistics

Professional career

WNBA
Hayes was selected by the Atlanta Dream as the second pick in the second round, the 14th overall pick of the 2012 WNBA Draft. In her rookie season, Hayes played 34 games with 17 starts while averaging 8.6 PPG as a reserve on the Dream's roster. She was named to the WNBA All-Rookie team.

In her second season, Hayes played 23 games with 4 starts and averaged 11.3 PPG. That season, the Dream advanced all the way to the 2013 WNBA Finals, but were swept by the Minnesota Lynx.

In the 2014 season, Hayes officially became the starting shooting guard for the Dream and averaged 12.9 PPG.

In 2016, Hayes re-signed with the Dream to a multi-year deal once her rookie contract expired. During the 2016 season, Hayes averaged 15 PPG. In a loss to the Los Angeles Sparks, Hayes scored a career-high 32 points. Her stellar performance continued into the playoffs, where she scored a playoff career-high 30 points in the second round elimination game against the Chicago Sky in a losing effort.

In 2017, with the team's leading scorer Angel McCoughtry deciding to rest during the season, Hayes took on more scoring responsibility in her absence and continued to improve offensively. She was voted into the 2017 WNBA All-Star Game, making it her very first all-star game appearance. By the end of the season, Hayes put up a career-high scoring average of 16.3 PPG, but the Dream finished with a 12–22 record, missing out on the playoffs.

In 2018, with the return of McCoughtry, the Dream was back in the mix for a playoff spot and eventually emerged as a title contender. Hayes was voted into the 2018 WNBA All-Star Game, making it her second all-star game appearance. She finished the season with a new career high in scoring. The Dream finished 23–11 with the number 2 seed in the league, receiving a double-bye to the semi-finals. McCoughtry was sidelined with a knee injury and the Dream were eliminated by the Washington Mystics in five games.

On August 10, 2019, Hayes scored a new-career high 34 points in a 87–82 loss to the Indiana Fever. With McCoughtry sidelined for the whole season with a knee injury, the Dream finished with a league worst 8–26 record.

Overseas
In the 2012-13 off-season, Hayes played in Israel for Hapoel Rishon LeZion. In the 2013-14 off-season, Hayes played in Turkey for Beşiktaş JK for the first portion of the off-season and spent the second portion of the off-season playing in Brazil for America de Recife. In the 2015-16 off-season, Hayes played in Turkey once again for Yakin Dogu. As of August 2016, Hayes signed with Mersin BSB S.K. for the 2016-17 off-season. In 2017, Hayes signed with Maccabi Ashdod for the 2017-18 offseason. In 2019, Hayes signed with Perfumerías Avenida of the Spanish League for the 2019-20 off-season and renewed for 2020-2021.

National team career
Hayes was a part of the United States women's national basketball team which won gold at the 2009 Summer Universiade held at Belgrade, Serbia. She also appeared in the exhibition match victory against China in 2018.

In 2015, Hayes became an Azerbaijani citizen, and competed for the Azerbaijan women's national basketball team at the 2015 European Games held in Baku, Azerbaijan during June 2015. She competed in the 3x3 basketball event, where her team progressed till the quarterfinals.

WNBA career statistics

Regular season

|-
| style="text-align:left;"| 2012
| style="text-align:left;"| Atlanta
| 34 || 17 || 23.1 || .390 || .273 || .786 || 3.1 || 2.1 || 0.8 || 0.3 || 1.5 || 8.6
|-
| style="text-align:left;"| 2013
| style="text-align:left;"| Atlanta
| 23 || 4 || 22.3 || .406 || .377 || .745 || 3.7 || 1.7 || 1.2 || 0.1 || 1.7 || 11.3
|-
| style="text-align:left;"| 2014
| style="text-align:left;"| Atlanta
| 34 || 32 || 28.4 || .464 || .357 || .760 || 3.0 || 2.5 || 1.0 || 0.2 || 1.2 || 12.9
|-
| style="text-align:left;"| 2015
| style="text-align:left;"| Atlanta
| 28 || 27 || 29.9 || .392 || .274 || .805 || 3.0 || 2.2 || 1.0 || 0.3 || 1.6 || 12.9
|-
| style="text-align:left;"| 2016
| style="text-align:left;"| Atlanta
| 33 || 33 || 30.8 || .441 || .274 || .804 || 3.4 || 2.4 || 1.2 || 0.2 || 1.7 || 15.0
|-
| style="text-align:left;"| 2017
| style="text-align:left;"| Atlanta
| 33 || 33 || 30.0 || .436 || .372 || .854 || 3.8 || 2.4 || 1.2 || 0.2 || 1.8 || 16.3
|-
| style="text-align:left;"| 2018
| style="text-align:left;"| Atlanta
| 31 || 29 || 28.9 || .441 || .321 || .817 || 3.6 || 2.7 || 1.1 || 0.2 || 1.6 || 17.2
|-
| style="text-align:left;"| 2019
| style="text-align:left;"| Atlanta
| 29 || 29 || 28.2 || .393 || .308 || .764 || 3.0 || 2.8 || 1.0 || 0.2 || 2.4 || 14.7
|-
| style="text-align:left;"| 2021
| style="text-align:left;"| Atlanta
| 21 || 19 || 28.3 || .438 || .405 || .853 || 3.2 || 3.0 || 1.6 || 0.2 || 1.5 || 14.7
|-
| style="text-align:left;"| 2022
| style="text-align:left;"| Atlanta
| 11 || 11 || 27.5 || .545 || .429 || .683 || 3.6 || 2.1 || 0.7 || 0.1 || 2.0 || 16.2
|-
| style="text-align:left;"| Career
| style="text-align:left;"| 10 years, 1 team
| 277 || 234 || 27.9 || .429 || .331 || .797 || 3.3 || 2.4 || 1.1 || 0.3 || 1.7 || 13.8

Postseason

|-
| style="text-align:left;"| 2012
| style="text-align:left;"| Atlanta
| 3 || 0 || 16.3 || .364 || .333 || 1.000 || 2.3 || 1.7 || 1.6 || 0.3 || 1.6 || 4.3
|-
| style="text-align:left;"| 2013
| style="text-align:left;"| Atlanta
| 8 || 6 || 28.4 || .390 || .353 || .767 || 4.5 || 1.9 || 0.6 || 0.0 || 1.3 || 12.4
|-
| style="text-align:left;"| 2014
| style="text-align:left;"| Atlanta
| 3 || 3 || 31.1 || .481 || .333|| .900 || 3.0 || 2.0 || 0.3 || 0.3 || 1.3 || 12.7
|-
| style="text-align:left;"| 2016
| style="text-align:left;"| Atlanta
| 1 || 1 || 36.7 || .588 || .429 || .875 || 6.0 || 2.0 || 1.0 || 0.0 || 2.0 || 30.0
|-
| style="text-align:left;"| 2018
| style="text-align:left;"| Atlanta
| 5 || 	5 || 33.6 || .444 || .375 || .800 || 6.2 || 3.4 || 1.4 || 0.2 || 2.0 || 16.4
|-
| style="text-align:left;"| Career
| style="text-align:left;"|5 years, 1 team
| 20 || 15 || 28.7 || .435 || .362 || .818 || 4.5 || 2.3 || 1.0 || 0.2 || 1.6 || 13.1

Awards and honors
 2007—MVP, Nike Nationals, HoopGurlz.com
 2007—First Team, All-State 5A (Florida)
 2008—McDonald's All-America
 2008—Parade Magazine All-America
 2009–10—Wade Watch
 2010–11—Wade Watch
 2011—First Team All Big East
 2012—WNBA All-Rookie Team

See also
 Connecticut Huskies women's basketball
 2008–09 Connecticut Huskies women's basketball team
 2009–10 Connecticut Huskies women's basketball team

References

External links
 
 Tiffany Hayes at USAB
 Tiffany Hayes at EuroLeague Women
 Tiffany Hayes at EuroCup Women
 

1989 births
Living people
People from Vernon Parish, Louisiana
All-American college women's basketball players
Atlanta Dream draft picks
Atlanta Dream players
American women's basketball players
Azerbaijani women's basketball players
American emigrants to Azerbaijan
Naturalized citizens of Azerbaijan
Azerbaijani people of African-American descent
European Games competitors for Azerbaijan
Basketball players at the 2015 European Games
United States women's national basketball team players
American expatriate basketball people in Turkey
American expatriate basketball people in Spain
Azerbaijani expatriate basketball people in Turkey
Azerbaijani expatriate basketball people in Spain
Beşiktaş women's basketball players
Mersin Büyükşehir Belediyesi S.K. players
McDonald's High School All-Americans
Parade High School All-Americans (girls' basketball)
Shooting guards
UConn Huskies women's basketball players
Universiade gold medalists for the United States
Universiade medalists in basketball
Medalists at the 2009 Summer Universiade
Women's National Basketball Association All-Stars
Azerbaijani expatriate basketball people in Israel
American expatriate basketball people in Israel
American expatriate basketball people in Brazil
Basketball players from Florida